As a large city, Sheffield, South Yorkshire, England, has many tourist attractions from performing arts centres to museums, shopping centres and public parks. Below is a list of some of the more famous and visited:

Abbeydale Industrial Hamlet 
Arts Tower
Beauchief Abbey 
Birley Spa
Bishops' House 
Crucible Theatre
Cutlers' Hall
Devonshire Green 
Don Valley Stadium
The Dore Stone
Endcliffe Park 
Graves Art Gallery
Graves Park 
IceSheffield
Kelham Island Museum 
Lyceum Theatre
Magna Science Adventure Centre
Meadowhall Shopping Centre
Millennium Galleries
Millhouses Park 
Old Queen's Head
Peace Gardens 
Ponds Forge
Rivelin Valley 
Rother Valley Country Park 
Sheaf Square 
Sheffield Arena
Sheffield Botanical Gardens 
Sheffield Cathedral 
Sheffield City Hall
Sheffield Fire and Police Museum 
Sheffield Manor
Sheffield Town Hall
Sheffield Walk of Fame 
Sheffield Winter Gardens 
Shepherd Wheel
Showroom Cinema
Site Gallery
Valley Centertainment
Victoria Quays 
Weston Park Museum 
Wheel of Sheffield
Wincobank (hill fort) 
Yorkshire ArtSpace

Tourist
 
Sheffield
Sheffield